This article is about the particular significance of the year 1953 to Wales and its people.

Incumbents
Archbishop of Wales – John Morgan, Bishop of Llandaff
Archdruid of the National Eisteddfod of Wales
Cynan (outgoing)
Dyfnallt (incoming)

Events

7 March – A "Saint David's Day" pageant is held by the London Welsh Association in the streets of London.
11 March – The Royal Badge of Wales is granted an augmentation of honour including the motto Y Ddraig goch ddyry cychwyn ("The red dragon inspires action").
1 June – In the Queen's Coronation Honours List, Victoria Cross recipient Ted Chapman is awarded the British Empire Medal.
9 July – Elizabeth II makes her first visit to Wales since her 2 June Coronation.
10 July – The royal tour of Wales concludes with a ceremony at Caernarfon Castle and visits to the National Eisteddfod site at Rhyl, Wrexham and the Llangollen International Musical Eisteddfod.
2 December – Llandudno experiences unusually warm weather as a result of the "foehn effect".
date unknown
The Royal College of General Practitioners is established in Wales.
Goronwy Rees becomes Principal of the University of Wales, Aberystwyth.
Grismond Picton Philipps is knighted.

Arts and literature
July 6 – Dorothy Squires marries Roger Moore in the United States.
date unknown
Thomas Parry (later Sir Thomas) becomes head of the National Library of Wales.
Waldo Williams leaves the Baptist denomination and becomes a Quaker.
Robert Frank photographs a Glamorgan mining village for U.S.Camera.
Susan Williams-Ellis joins her father, Sir Clough Williams-Ellis, in his work on the village of Portmeirion.

Awards
Emyr Humphreys wins the Somerset Maugham Prize for Hear and Forgive.
National Eisteddfod of Wales (held in Rhyl)
National Eisteddfod of Wales: Chair – E. Llwyd Williams, "Y Ffordd"
National Eisteddfod of Wales: Crown – Dilys Cadwaladr, "Y Llen"
National Eisteddfod of Wales: Prose Medal – withheld

New books

English language
Jack Jones – Time and the Business
Bertrand Russell –  Satan in the Suburbs and Other Stories

Welsh language
Islwyn Ffowc Elis 
Cysgod y Cryman
Ffenestri Tua'r Gwyll
David John Williams – Hen dŷ ffarm

Music
8 June – Geraint Evans appears in the première of Benjamin Britten's Gloriana.

Film
Rachel Thomas and Clifford Evans co-star in Valley of Song.
Richard Burton stars in The Robe.
Rachel Roberts stars in The Limping Man.

Broadcasting
6 January – The Broadcasting Council for Wales meets for the first time.
January – Edward Williamson, Bishop of Swansea and Brecon, broadcasts a lecture on Henry Vaughan on BBC radio.
9 December – In the UK Parliament, the Postmaster General, Earl De La Warr, confirms that none of the first independent television stations will be located in Wales.

Welsh-language television
1 March – First broadcast of a television programme entirely in Welsh: a religious service from the Tabernacle Baptist Chapel, Cardiff.

English-language television
The National Eisteddfod of Wales is broadcast on BBC television, with English commentary by Hywel Davies.

Sport
Archery – The North Wales Archery Society is founded.
Rugby – In December, Wales defeat New Zealand 13-8 at Cardiff Arms Park.

Births
10 February – Jeffrey John, Dean of St Albans
15 March - Alan Couch, footballer
11 April – Rhodri Glyn Thomas AM, politician
12 April – Huw Edwards, Labour politician, MP for Monmouth 1991–1992 and 1997–2005
26 April – Andy Secombe, voice actor and fantasy novelist
8 June – Bonnie Tyler, singer
7 July – Eleri Rees, judge  
11 July – Nigel Rees, footballer
20 July – Dave Evans, singer
10 August – Gillian Elisa, actress, singer and comedian
2 September – Keith Allen, comedian and actor
28 October – Phil Dwyer, footballer
16 November – Griff Rhys Jones, actor, comedian and television presenter
In Australia – Shani Rhys James, painter

Deaths
10 January – Howell Elvet Lewis ("Elved"), poet and Archdruid, 92
7 March – Jack Williams, Victoria Cross recipient, 66
20 March – Fred Parfitt, Wales international rugby player, 83
24 March – Mary of Teck, Princess of Wales 1910–1936, queen consort of the United Kingdom 1936–1952, 85
6 April – Idris Davies, poet, 48
30 April – Sir David Rocyn-Jones, medical practitioner and President of the WRU, 90
2 May – Thomas Mardy Rees, author, 81/82
23 May – Henry McLaren, 2nd Baron Aberconway, industrialist, horticulturalist and politician, 74
5 June – Elizabeth Mary Jones ("Moelona"), novelist, 75 
18 June – Reg Plummer, Wales and British Lion rugby union player, 64
26 August – Rachel Barrett, Welsh editor and suffragette, 77
9 November – Dylan Thomas, poet, 39
11 November – John Glyn Davies, poet and children's writer, 83
26 November – Sir Ivor Atkins, organist and choirmaster, 83
27 November – T. F. Powys, Anglo-Welsh writer, 77
17 December – David Rees Griffiths, poet, 71

See also
1953 in Northern Ireland

References

 
Wales